Joe Dixon (born 31 May 1940) is  a former Australian rules footballer who played with Fitzroy in the Victorian Football League (VFL).		
	
Dixon's son Ben Dixon played for Hawthorn Football Club.

Notes

External links 		
		
		

		
Living people		
1940 births		
Australian rules footballers from Victoria (Australia)		
Fitzroy Football Club players
Yarrawonga Football Club players